Deep Waters is a collection of short stories by British writer William Hope Hodgson published in 1967 by Arkham House in an edition of 2,556 copies, the second of the author's books to be published by Arkham.  The stories are primarily set in the Sargasso Sea.

Contents
 Deep Waters contains the following tales:

 "Foreword", by August Derleth
 "The Sea Horses"
 "The Derelict"
 "The Thing in the Weeds"
 "From the Tideless Sea"
 "The Island of the Ud"
 "The Voice in the Night"
 "The Adventure of the Headland"
 "The Mystery of the Derelict"
 "The Shamraken Homeward Bounder"
 "The Stone Ship"
 "The Crew of the Lancing"
 "The Habitants of Middle Islet"
 "The Call in the Dawn"

Sources 

1967 short story collections
Fantasy short story collections
Horror short story collections
Short story collections by William Hope Hodgson
Arkham House books